Benzone may refer to:
 Phenylbutazone (a drug for which Benzone is a trade name)
 Benzophenone-n, a class of compounds derived from benzophenone, including
 Oxybenzone
 Dioxybenzone
and mostly used in sunscreens